Ro-1, originally named Submarine No. 18, was an Imperial Japanese Navy Type F submarine of the F1 subclass. She and her sister ship  were the first truly seagoing Japanese submarines, and the earliest to be classified as "second-class" or "medium" submarines of the Ro series. She was commissioned in 1920 and operated in the waters of Japan. She was stricken in 1932.

Design and description
The Type F submarines were designed by the Italian firm Fiat-Laurenti and built under license by Kawasaki at Kobe, Japan. They were the Imperial Japanese Navy′s first true seagoing submarines, and when the Japanese adopted a three-tiered classification system of its submarines as first-class (I), second-class or medium (Ro), and third-class (Ha) on 1 November 1924, the Type F submarines were the earliest to receive the second-class classification, as reflected in their low numbers in the Ro series, and in fact they were the earliest Japanese submarine classified as anything higher than third-class. They had non-cylindrical hulls intended to provide extra internal space, but the Japanese considered the hulls weak despite the provision of additional scantlings during construction to reinforce them. Because of their disappointing performance, they did not serve as the basis for any later Japanese submarine classes.

The submarines of the F1 subclass displaced  surfaced and  submerged. For surface running, the submarines were powered by two  Fiat diesel engines, each driving one propeller shaft. When submerged each propeller was driven by a Savigliano  electric motor. They could reach  on the surface and  underwater.

The submarines were armed with five  torpedo tubes, three in the bow and two in the stern, and carried a total of eight Type 44 torpedoes. As built, they were armed with a 7.7 mm machine gun. Soon after completion, however, a  deck gun was added.

Construction and commissioning

Ordered under the Japanese 1915–1916 naval program, Ro-1 was laid down as Submarine No. 18 on 5 January 1917 by Kawasaki at Kobe, Japan. Launched on 28 July 1919, she was completed and commissioned on 31 March 1920.

Service history

Upon commissioning, Submarine No. 18 was attached to the Kure Naval District. On 20 April 1920, she was assigned to Submarine Division 14 in Submarine Squadron 1 in the 1st Fleet. On 1 December 1920, she was reassigned to Submarine Division 21 in the Sasebo Defense Division in the Sasebo Naval District, and she spent the remainder of her career serving in this capacity. She was renamed Ro-1 on 1 November 1924.

Ro-1 was stricken from the Navy list on 1 April 1932.

Notes

Bibliography
 Gray, Randal, ed., Conway′s All the World′s Fighting Ships 1906–1921, Annapolis, Maryland: Naval Institute Press, 1985, .

Ro-1-class submarines
Type F submarines
Ships built by Kawasaki Heavy Industries
1919 ships